Eduardo Luis Lima Prado (born 9 October 1992) is a Venezuelan footballer who currently plays for Atlético Venezuela as a goalkeeper. He has been capped by Venezuela U20.

References

1992 births
Living people
People from Maturín
Venezuelan footballers
Association football goalkeepers
Monagas S.C. players
Deportivo Miranda F.C. players
Portuguesa F.C. players